Die Kreuzen (/ˈdiːˈkɹɔɪtsn̩/) is an American rock band from Milwaukee, Wisconsin formed in 1981. The name, which was taken from a German Bible, is grammatically incorrect German for "the crosses." They began as a hardcore punk group and evolved musically to alternative rock.

History

Early years
Die Kreuzen was originally called "The Stellas". It consisted of Dan Kubinski on vocals, Brian Egeness on guitar, Keith Brammer on bass guitar, and Erik Tunison on drums.

After contributing tracks to the Charred Remains and The Master Tape compilations, the band's debut release was the Cows and Beer EP. Their 21-song eponymous debut album was released in 1984, and included new versions of the tracks from Cows and Beer. The 1986 follow-up, October File, saw the band move away from hardcore into slower, more conceptual work. Their third album, Century Days (1988), saw the band incorporate piano and a horn section.

Later years, side projects, and break up
In 1989, as a side project, Brammer joined the band Wreck. Other members worked on side projects, including Kubinski and Egeness's Cheap Trick tribute band Chick Treat. On April 1, 1992, Egeness left the band. Shortly thereafter, the rest of the band members formed the band Chainfall, along with guitarist Charles Jordan (of S.O.D.A and Nerve Twins). Kubinski and Tunison later played in Fuckface, while Brammer played with the Carnival Strippers. Kubinski went on to form a new band, Custom Grand. Kubinski now plays in Decapitado.  Egeness has composed scores for the movies The Astonished Man (2008), Wake Before I Die (2011), and The Weather Outside (2011).

The majority of their records were produced by future Nirvana and Smashing Pumpkins producer, Butch Vig. All of their records, with the exception of their first 7" on Version Sound, were released by the Chicago record label, Touch & Go Records.

Tributes and reunion
In 2005, a tribute to Die Kreuzen was released, Lean Into It - A Tribute to Die Kreuzen, featuring covers of Die Kreuzen songs by Napalm Death, Mike Watt, Voivod, Season to Risk, and Vic Bondi, among others. The album features liner notes by Thurston Moore, who states, "Man, there was a point there when Die Kreuzen were the best band in the USA".

In 2011, Die Kreuzen were inducted into the Wisconsin Area Music Industry (WAMI) Hall of Fame. In their acceptance speech, they named a handful of current artists that they thought deserved consideration: IfIHadAHiFi, Northless, the Zebras, and Zola Jesus.

Die Kreuzen resumed playing shows, performing a sold-out concert on May 26, 2012, at Turner Hall in Milwaukee. Thereafter they played the  2013 Roadburn Festival in Tilburg, Holland and the Afterburner show the following day. After their return to the states, Die Kreuzen played a secret show at a small Milwaukee club as a warm up to their May 25 concert at The Double Door in Chicago and their much anticipated return to Turner Hall on May 26, 2012. Die Kreuzen scheduled shows in Green Bay and Madison, WI and Minneapolis, MN (with Negative Approach, Mudhoney and The Melvins) later on in the summer of 2013. Die Kreuzen also played at McAuliffe's Pub in Racine, Wisconsin, July 17, 2013. A book entitled The Crossing: The Oral History of Die Kreuzen was in production with a tentative 2016 completion date.

Musical style
The band were initially a hardcore punk band but took in elements of heavy metal, gothic rock, shoegaze and alternative rock. They have been described as "anticipating the grunge rock sound of the '90s" and were credited with bringing intelligence and lyrical diversity to the heavy metal genre. In 1986, Robert Palmer of The New York Times described Die Kreuzen as "one of the new bands recasting the legacy of 70's Gothic-metal (Black Sabbath, etc.) for this modern age".

Discography

Albums
 Die Kreuzen (1984)
 October File (1986, CD included first album)
 Century Days (1988)
 Cement (1991)
 Internal (1993) (promo-only)

EPs
 Cows and Beer (1982)
 Gone Away (1989)

7" singles
 "Gone Away"/"Different ways" (live) (1989)
 "Pink Flag"/"Land of Treason" (1990)
 "Big Bad Days"/"Gone Away" (acoustic) (1991)

Demo releases
Demo Tape (1982)

Compilation appearances
Charred Remains compilation tape (1981, Version Sound): "Pain", "Hate Me"
The Master Tape LP (1982, Affirmation): "On the Street", "All White", "Fighting"
America's Dairyland tape (1983, Last Rites): "Think For Me", "Enemies", "Rumors"
Code Blue tape (1984, Last Rites): "Fuck Up", "Live Wire", "Champs"
Sugar Daddy Live Split Series Vol. 5 split 12" with the Melvins, Negative Approach and Necros (2012, Amphetamine Reptile Records): "In School"

See also
Wreck (band)

References

External links
Official website
Brian Egeness's Official website
Brian Egeness on IMDB
Decapitado official website
American Hardcore - film containing early footage of the band
Interview with bassist Keith Brammer at Perfect Sound Forever
Albini, Steve (1986) "DIE KREUZEN: PUTTING WITH POTATOES" (interview), Forced Exposure, Issue No. 10
Trofobya, Klaus "Die Kreuzen Review", Head Heritage
Conan Neutron's Protonic Reversal Episode 106 - Keith Brammer (Die Kreuzen) 

Alternative rock groups from Wisconsin
Hardcore punk groups from Wisconsin
Musicians from Milwaukee
Musical groups established in 1981
Musical groups disestablished in 1992
Touch and Go Records artists